In Bucharest there are memorial houses and museums. Most of them are memorial houses, art museums, or both.

The list

References

Museums
 
Bucharest